Bermuda is an archipelago consisting of 181 islands.

List of islands

See also
Geography of Bermuda

References
Bermuda's 123 Islands Listed by name, large and small, present and past
Bermuda Islands, SatelliteViews.net

External links

Islands of Bermuda @ United Nations Environment Programme
Island information @ WorldIslandInfo.com
Islands description @ Bermuda-online.org

Islands
Bermuda